Edelmiro Arévalo (7 January 1929 - 3 January 2008) was a Paraguayan football defender who played for Paraguay in the 1958 FIFA World Cup. He also played for Club Olimpia. He died on 3 January 2008 at the age of 78.

References

External links
FIFA profile

1929 births
Paraguayan footballers
Paraguay international footballers
Association football defenders
Club Olimpia footballers
1958 FIFA World Cup players
2008 deaths